Manuel Alejandro García (born 25 April 1985) is a Chilean footballer who plays as a midfielder. He is currently a free agent.

Career
García began his senior career in 2003 with Coquimbo Unido of the Chilean Primera División. He remained with the club for six years and made a total of one hundred and two appearances, whilst scoring five times including his first during the 2004 season against Deportes La Serena on 3 November. In 2010, García joined Primera B de Chile side Deportes Copiapó. One goal, versus San Marcos, in ten games followed. 2013 saw fellow Primera B team Lota Schwager sign García. However, he departed soon after following three appearances.

References

External links

1985 births
Living people
People from Coquimbo
Chilean footballers
Association football midfielders
Chilean Primera División players
Primera B de Chile players
Coquimbo Unido footballers
Deportes Copiapó footballers
Lota Schwager footballers